Bloody Kids is a British television film written by Stephen Poliakoff and directed by Stephen Frears, made by Black Lion Films for ATV, and first shown on ITV on 22 March 1980.

Cast
 Derrick O'Connor as Detective Ritchie (Richard Beckinsale originally cast before his sudden death)
 Gary Holton as Ken
 Richard Thomas as Leo Turner
 Peter Clark as Mike Simmonds
 Gwyneth Strong as Jan, Ken's Girlfriend
 Caroline Embling as Susan, Leo's Sister
 Jack Douglas as Senior Police Officer
 Billy Colvill as Williams
 P.H. Moriarty as Police 1
 Richard Hope as Police 2
 Niall Padden as Police 3
 John Mulcahy as Police 4
 Terry Paris as Police 5
 Neil Cunningham as School Master 1
 George Costigan as School Master 2
 Stewart Harwood as School's Security Guard
 Tammy Jacobs as School 1
 Daniel Peacock as School 2
 Paul Mari  as School 3
 Mel Smith  as Disco Doorman
 C.P. Lee   as Club Manager
 Jimmy Hibbert as Disco 3
 Kim Taylforth as Disco 4
 Nula Conwell as Ken's Gang 1
 Madeline Church as Ken's Gang 2
 Peter Wilson as Ken's Gang 3
 Gary Olsen as Ken's Gang 4 (as Gary Olson)
 Jesse Birdsall as Ken's Gang 5
 Roger Lloyd-Pack as Hospital Doctor
 Brenda Fricker as Nurse
 June Watson as Nurse
 Colin Campbell as Conductor
 Julian Hough as Reporter
 Geraldine James as Ritchie's Wife
 Pauline Walker - posh bird and dancing extra

Filming locations
Filmed in south east Essex, with locations in Southend-on-Sea, Westcliff, Leigh-on-Sea and Canvey Island, the opening five minutes are of the bridge down to Leigh-on-Sea's cockle sheds, with a lorry hanging over.

Furtherwick Park School Canvey Island, was used for the school scenes, and Southend United's ground, Roots Hall, was used for the stabbing scenes.

Disco scenes in Southend are notable for an early television appearance of Mel Smith playing the bouncer. Victoria Circus, Southend seafront and hospital are all used as locations, culminating in a climactic scene outside the Casino, Canvey Island, on a London double decker bus.

References

External links

1979 television films
1979 films
British television films
Films scored by George Fenton
Films directed by Stephen Frears